Neussargues en Pinatelle (Auvergnat: Nuçargues en Pinatèla) is a commune in the Cantal department in south-central France. The municipality was established on 1 December 2016 and consists of the former communes of Celles, Chalinargues, Chavagnac, Neussargues-Moissac and Sainte-Anastasie.

See also
Communes of the Cantal department

References 

Communes of Cantal
Populated places established in 2016